La Débâcle (1892), translated as The Debacle and The Downfall, is the penultimate novel of Émile Zola's Les Rougon-Macquart series, which first appeared as a serial in  from 21 February to 21 July 1892, before being published in book form by Charpentier.

The story is set against the background of the political and military tumults that ended the reign of Napoléon III and the Second Empire in 1870, in particular the Franco-Prussian War, the Battle of Sedan, and the Paris Commune. 

Despite the hostility with which it was initially received by Bonapartists, monarchists, and in particular by veterans of the French army, La Débâcle was Zola’s greatest commercial success, selling one hundred fifty thousand copies within five months of its release.

The late nineteenth century English novelist George Gissing tried to read the novel in French in February 1896, through "intervals of rage", but without specifying what was the cause.

Plot
The novel starts in the summer of 1870, when after serious diplomatic tensions, France has declared war on Prussia (the nucleus of Germany which was then emerging as one nation out of a number of disparate cities, regions and principalities). The French hoped to achieve a quick victory by marching their armies east, straight to Berlin. Instead, the Prussian armies crossed the Rhine before the French, beat the French Rhine army into retreat and invaded France.

The novel is by far the longest of the Rougon-Macquart series. Its main character is Jean Macquart, a farmer who after having lost his wife and land (in the novel La Terre), has joined the army for the campaign of 1870. The main theme is the brutality of war for the common soldier and for the civilian population, hit by the death of family and friends and by economic hardship. It is written in three parts.

In the first part, the French army corps in which Jean Macquart is a corporal moves to the southern part of the Rhine valley, only to retreat to Belfort. Reacting to the crushing defeat of another corps in Alsace and the Prussian advance through the Vosges, Macquart's corps is moved by train back to Paris and then to Reims without having seen battle. The growing demoralisation and fatigue of the French soldiers as they are ordered back and forth in pointless manoeuvres is poignantly described. A growing disorganisation of the army becomes apparent as it is unable to move food and equipment to where it is needed. The army corps of Jean is then moved to Reims from which it is supposed to march to the eastern French city of Metz, where another French army is besieged by the Prussians. In a reaction to pressure and movements by the Prussians, the march deviates from its original objective to the north and the French army ends up in the neighbourhood of the city of Sedan, in the Meuse river valley near the Belgian border. In the meantime, Jean has befriended Maurice, a soldier whose sister Henriette lives in Sedan.

The second part describes the battle of Sedan. During this battle, the Prussian army succeeds in encircling Sedan and moving its artillery to the hills surrounding the city, trapping the French in the valley in a desperate position. The French army fails to break the encirclement. The part describes the battle as seen by the protagonists, Jean, Maurice, Henriette and Weiss, her husband, a civilian, who dies defending his house against the Prussians as they invade his village. The battle ends with the French army being beaten back to Sedan and capitulating to the threat of the Prussian artillery to destroy Sedan and everyone in it. The Emperor and the French army at Sedan become prisoners of war.

In the third part, the French army is held prisoner for a week, after which it is marched to Germany. Jean and Maurice manage to escape. Jean is wounded during the escape and ends up in the neighbourhood of Sedan where he is hidden and nursed by Henriette, the healing taking till winter. After a while, Maurice moves on to Paris, encircled by the Prussians during the winter and early spring of 1871. In the spring of 1871, Jean has rejoined the French army at the service of a new government, which has negotiated an armistice with the Prussians. A popular uprising takes place in Paris, fuelled by the humiliation of the armistice. The French government succeeds in breaking the uprising, during which Jean mortally wounds Maurice, who fights on the side of the insurgents. The novel ends by bringing three of its main characters together: Jean, the dying Maurice and his sister Henriette who has travelled to Paris after having lost contact with her brother for more than two months.

English translations
La Débâcle has been translated into English six times: as The Downfall by Ernest Vizetelly for Chatto & Windus in 1892; by Elizabeth Pennell Robins for Cassell in 1892; and by W.M. Sloane for D. Appleton & Co. in 1902. John Hands and Leonard Tancock both translated the work as The Debacle, for Elek Books in 1968, and for Penguin in 1972, respectively. The sixth and most recent translation by Elinor Dorday appeared under its original French title as an Oxford World's Classic in 2000.

Graham King criticizes Vizetelly's translation of La Debacle for its use of unrealistic dialogue between the French soldiers and his excessive attention to unimportant details; E.P. Robins's translation is only described as being done "very well."

With regard to two of the other translations, King writes: "Tancock . . . sacrifices style for precision and while his is the most literally correct modern translation, Hands’s licence with the original results in a more readable narrative."

Reception
An anonymous reviewer in the Athenaeum writes:

According to Benjamin W. Wells:

References

External links

 
 
  

Fiction set in 1870
Fiction set in 1871
1892 French novels
Books of Les Rougon-Macquart
Novels by Émile Zola
Novels first published in serial form